Milaimys Marín is a Cuban freestyle wrestler. She won the gold medal in the girls' freestyle 73 kg event at the 2018 Summer Youth Olympics held in Buenos Aires, Argentina. She also won the gold medal in the women's 76 kg event at the 2021 Junior Pan American Games held in Cali, Colombia.

In 2019, she was eliminated in her first match in the women's freestyle 76 kg event at the World Wrestling Championships held in Nur-Sultan, Kazakhstan. At the 2019 World U23 Wrestling Championship held in Budapest, Hungary, she won the gold medal in the 72 kg event.

In 2020, she competed at the Pan American Olympic Qualification Tournament without qualifying for the 2020 Summer Olympics in Tokyo, Japan. She also failed to qualify for the Olympics at the 2021 World Olympic Qualification Tournament held in Sofia, Bulgaria.

She competed in the 76 kg event at the 2022 World Wrestling Championships held in Belgrade, Serbia. She won her first match and she was then eliminated by Anastasiia Shustova of Ukraine.

References

External links 
 

Living people
Year of birth missing (living people)
Place of birth missing (living people)
Cuban female sport wrestlers
Wrestlers at the 2018 Summer Youth Olympics
Youth Olympic gold medalists for Cuba
21st-century Cuban women